Muhammad Sadaqat (born 2 April 1968) is a Pakistani sprinter. He competed in the men's 4 × 400 metres relay at the 1988 Summer Olympics.

References

1968 births
Living people
Athletes (track and field) at the 1988 Summer Olympics
Pakistani male sprinters
Olympic athletes of Pakistan
Commonwealth Games competitors for Pakistan
Athletes (track and field) at the 1990 Commonwealth Games
Place of birth missing (living people)
Athletes (track and field) at the 1994 Asian Games
Asian Games competitors for Pakistan
20th-century Pakistani people